Liebeneiner is a surname. Notable people with the surname include:

Johanna Liebeneiner (born 1945), German actress
Wolfgang Liebeneiner (1905–1987), German actor, film director and theatre director